Dialifor (Torak) is an organophosphate pesticide. It is extremely poisonous.

References

Acetylcholinesterase inhibitors
Organophosphate insecticides